Malta competed in the Summer Olympic Games for the first time at the 1928 Summer Olympics in Amsterdam, Netherlands. Nine water polo players represented Malta.

Water polo

Men's tournament

Roster
 Harry Bonavia
 Meme Busietta
 Victor Busietta
 Louis Darmanin
 Edoardo Magri
 Francisco Nappa
 Victor Pace
 Turu Rizzo
 Roger Vella

Round of 16

Quarterfinals

References

External links
Official Olympic Reports

Nations at the 1928 Summer Olympics
1928 Summer Olympics
1928 in Malta